Thomas Master may refer to:

 Thomas Master (died 1643) (1603–1643), English poet and divine
 Thomas Master (died 1680) (1624–1680), English MP, 1660–1680
 Thomas Master (died 1770) (1690–1770), English MP, 1712–1747
 Thomas Master (died 1710) (1663–1710), English MP, 1685–1690
 Thomas Master (died 1749) (1717–1749), English MP, 1747–1749